Choi Moon-ju (born August 4, 1985), better known as Choi Soo-eun is a South Korean actress and singer. She is a former member of South Korean girl group Gangkiz.

Music career

Soo-eun debuted as a member of the girl group Gangkiz in 2012, their group released mini album "We Became Gang" and repackaged mini album "Mama" in the same year. A year later, she left the group and became an actress.

Discography

Filmography

Television drama

Television show

References

External links

1983 births
Living people
MBK Entertainment artists
South Korean female idols
South Korean women pop singers
K-pop singers
South Korean television actresses
21st-century South Korean singers
21st-century South Korean women singers